Missing You, Missin' You, or Missing U may refer to:

Film and television
 Missing You (2008 film), a Singaporean film
 Missing You (2016 film), a South Korean film
 Missing U (film), a 2013 short animated film by Brooke Wagstaff
 Missing You (Hong Kong TV series), a 2012–2013 drama starring Linda Chung and Jason Chan
 Missing You (South Korean TV series), a 2012–2013 drama starring Yoochun and Yoon Eun-hye

Literature 
 Missing You, a 2006 novel by Meg Cabot

Music

Albums 
 Missing You (album) or its title track, by Peabo Bryson, 2007
 Missing You, a 2000 album by E-Rotic
 Missing You, a 1999 album by Fann Wong
 Missing You, a 2003 album by Fly to the Sky
 Missing You, a 2009 album by Gina Thompson
 Missing You, a 2000 album by John Ellison
 Missing You, a 1989 album by the Marcy Brothers
 Missing You, a 1996 album by Sammi Cheng
 Missing You, a 2019 EP by the Vamps

Songs 
 "Missing You" (2NE1 song), 2013
 "Missing You" (Black Eyed Peas song), 2010
 "Missing You" (Brandy, Gladys Knight, Tamia, and Chaka Khan song), from the film Set It Off, 1996
 "Missing You" (Case song), 2001
 "Missin' You" (Charley Pride song), 1979
 "Missing You" (Chris de Burgh song), 1988
 "Missing You" (Christy Moore song), a 1980s folk song written by Jimmy MacCarthy
 "Missing You" (Dan Fogelberg song), 1982
 "Missing You" (Diana Ross song), 1984
 "Missing You" (Ingrid Michaelson song), 2019
 "Missing You" (John Waite song), 1984, covered by Tina Turner (1996) and Brooks & Dunn (1999)
 "Missing You" (Mary J. Blige song), 1997
 "Missing You" (Red Sovine song), 1955, covered by Webb Pierce (1957), Ray Peterson (1961), and Jim Reeves (1964)
 "Missing You" (The Saturdays song), 2010
 "Missing You" (Soul II Soul song), 1990
 "Missing You" (Steve Perry song), 1994
 "Missin' You (It Will Break My Heart)", by Ken Hirai, 2002
 "Missing U" (song), by Robyn, 2018
 "Missing You", by Alex Gaudino, 2013
 "Missing You", by All Time Low from Future Hearts, 2015
 "Missing You", by Artful & Ridney featuring Terri Walker, 2013
 "Missing You", by Beverley Craven from Beverley Craven, 1990
 "Missing You", by Bob Mould from Body of Song, 2005
 "Missing You", by BtoB from Brother Act., 2017
 "Missing You", by Budjerah, 2020
 "Missing You", by Chance the Rapper from 10 Day, 2012
 "Missing You", by Coro from Coro, 1991
 "Missing You", by Green Day from ¡Tré!
 "Missing You", by Jolin Tsai from J-Game, 2005
 "Missing You", by Kim English from Higher Things, 1998
 "Missing You", by Lucy Carr, 2002
 "Missing You", by Trace Adkins from Comin' On Strong, 2003
 "Missin' You", by Trey Songz from Trey Day, 2007
 "Missing You: Time to Love", by Nami Tamaki from Ready!, 2011

See also 
"I Am Missing You", a 1974 song by Ravi Shankar
"I'm Missin' You", a 2000 song by Shirley Myers
 Miss You (disambiguation)
 I Miss You (disambiguation)